Jiangsu Tower is a 208-meter-high skyscraper in the City of Shenzhen, Guangdong, the People's Republic of China. The Tower was opened in 2001, near Shenzhen Children Hospital, Lianhuashan Park and Shenzhen Municipal People's Government at Civic Centre.

References

Skyscrapers in Shenzhen
Buildings and structures completed in 2001
2001 establishments in China